There are two rivers named Piranji River in Brazil:

 Piranji River (Pernambuco), a river of Pernambuco
 Piranji River (Piauí)